Manasa is a Hindu goddess of snakes. She is worshipped mainly in Bihar, Bengal, Jharkhand, Lower Assam and other parts of northeastern India and in Uttarakhand, chiefly for the prevention and cure of snakebite, and also for fertility and prosperity. In Hindu mythology, Manasa is the sister of the first two naga kings, Shesha and Vasuki, and the wife of Sage Jaratkaru. She is the mother of the sage Astika. She is also known as Vishahari (the destroyer of poison), Nityā (eternal) and Padmavati.

In the Puranas, the sage Kashyapa is considered to be her father, one legend stating that she was created from his mind, and the other stating that she is his daughter from his wife, Kadru. In regional tradition, her myths emphasise her bad temper and unhappiness, due to rejection by her father, Shiva, and her husband, and the hate of her stepmother Chandi (Shiva's wife, identified with Parvati in this context). Manasa is depicted as kind to her devotees, but harsh toward people who refuse to worship her. Denied full godhood due to her mixed parentage, Manasa's aim was to fully establish her authority as a goddess, and to acquire steadfast human devotees.

Origin

Bhattacharya and Sen suggest that Manasa originated in South India as a non-Vedic and non-Aryan goddess and is related to the Kannada folk snake-goddess Manchamma. Manasa was originally an Adivasi (tribal) goddess. She was accepted in the pantheon worshipped by Hindu lower caste groups. Later, Dimock suggests that though snake worship is found in the Vedas (the earliest Hindu scriptures), Manasa - a human goddess of snakes - has "little basis" in early Hinduism. Bhattacharya suggests another influence on Manasa being the Mahayana Buddhist goddess of poison-cure Janguli. Janguli shares his swan vehicle and her poison-destroyer epithet with Manasa. Manasa is also known as Janguli. A theory suggests that Janguli may have influenced by the Kirata-giri ("the conqueror of all poisons") of the Atharvaveda. As per McDaniel, she was included in higher caste Hindu pantheon, where she is now regarded as a Hindu goddess rather than a tribal one.

According to Tate, Manasa as Jaratkaru was initially recognized as a daughter of sage Kashyapa and Kadru, the mother of all nagas in the Hindu epic Mahabharata. According to Bhattacharya, the Jaratkaru of the Mahabharata is not the Manasa popular in Bengal.

By the 14th century, Manasa was identified as the goddess of fertility and marriage rites and was assimilated into the Shaiva pantheon, related to the god Shiva. Myths glorified her by describing that she saved Shiva after he drank the poison, and venerated her as the "remover of poison". Her popularity grew and spread to southern India, and her followers began to rival the earliest Shaivism (the cult of Shiva). As a consequence, stories attributing Manasa's birth to Shiva emerged and ultimately Shaivism adopted this indigenous goddess into the Brahmanical tradition of mainstream Hinduism. Alternatively, Vasudev suggests that the Bengali tale of Manasa reflects rivalry between Shaivism and the goddess-centric Shaktism.

Iconography

Manasa is depicted as a woman covered with snakes, sitting on a lotus platform or standing upon a snake. She is sheltered by the canopy of the hoods of seven cobras. Sometimes, she is depicted with a child on her lap. The child is assumed to be her son, Astika.

Legend

Mahabharata
The Mahabharata tells the story of Manasa's marriage. Sage Jaratkaru practised severe austerities and had decided to abstain from marriage. Once, he came across a group of men hanging from a tree upside down. These men were his ancestors, who were doomed to misery as their children had not performed their last rites. So, they advised Jaratkaru to marry and have a son who could free them of those miseries by performing the ceremonies. Vasuki offered his sister Manasa's hand to Jaratkaru. Manasa gave birth to a son, Astika, who freed his ancestors. Astika also helped in saving the naga race from destruction when King Janamejaya decided to exterminate them by sacrificing them in his yajna, called the sarpa satra.

Puranas

The Puranas are the first scriptures to speak about her birth. They declare that sage Kashyapa is her father, not Shiva as described in the later Mangalkavyas. Once, when serpents and reptiles had created chaos on the Earth, Kashyapa created the goddess Manasa from his mind (mana). The creator god Brahma made her the presiding deity of snakes and reptiles. Manasa gained control over the earth, by the power of mantras she chanted. Manasa then propitiated the god Shiva, who told her to please the god Krishna. Upon being pleased, Krishna granted her divine Siddhi powers and ritually worshipped her, making her an established goddess.

Kashyapa married Manasa to sage Jaratkaru, who agreed to marry her on the condition that he would leave her if she disobeyed him. Once, when Jaratkaru was awakened by Manasa, he became upset with her because she awakened him too late for worship, and so he left her temporarily.

Mangalkavyas

The Mangalkavyas were devotional paeans to local deities such as Manasa, composed in Bengal between the 13th and the 18th centuries. The Manasa Mangalkavya by Vijay Gupta and Manasa Vijaya (1495) by Bipradas Pipilai trace the origin and myths of the goddess. However these stray further from Puranaic references probably due to creative licenses exercised.

At least fifteen Mangalkavyas dedicated to Manasa are known. Scholar D. C. Sen traced fifty-one versions of her tale.

According to Manasa Vijaya, Manasa was born when a statue of a girl that had been sculpted by Vasuki's mother which was touched by Shiva's seed. Vasuki accepted Manasa as his sister, and granted her the charge of poison that was produced when King Prithu milked the Earth as a cow. When Shiva saw Manasa, he was attracted to her, but she proved to him that he was her father. Shiva took Manasa to his home where his wife, Chandi, suspected Manasa of being Shiva's concubine or co-wife, and insulted Manasa and burnt one of her eyes, leaving Manasa half-blind. Later, when Shiva was dying of poison, Manasa cured him. On one occasion, when Chandi kicked her, Manasa rendered her senseless with a glance of her poison eye. Finally, tired of quarrels between Manasa and Chandi, Shiva deserted Manasa under a tree, but created a companion for her from his tears of remorse, called Neto or Netā.

Later, the sage Jaratkaru married Manasa, but Chandi ruined Manasa's wedding night. Chandi advised Manasa to wear snake ornaments and then threw a frog in the bridal chamber which caused the snakes to run around the chamber. As a consequence, the terrified Jaratkaru ran away from the house. After few days, he returned and Astika, their son, was born.

Accompanied by her adviser, Neto, Manasa descended to earth to see human devotees. She was initially mocked by the people but then Manasa forced them to worship her by raining calamity on those who denied her power. She managed to convert people from different walks of life, including the Muslim ruler Hasan, but failed to convert Chand Sadagar. Manasa wanted to become a goddess like Lakshmi or Saraswati. To get there, she had to achieve the worship of Chand Sadagar who was extremely adamant and took oath not to worship Manasa. Thus to gain his fear and insecurity, Manasa one by one killed his six sons. At last Manasa conspired against two dancers of Indras Court who loved each other, Anirudha and Usha. Anirudh had to take birth as Lakhinder, Chand and Sanaka's seventh son. Usha took birth as Behula and married him. Manasa killed him but Behula floated on water for nine months with the dead body of her husband and finally brought back the lives of the seven sons and the lost prosperity of Chand. At last, he yielded by offering a flower to the goddess with his left hand without even looking at her. This gesture made Manasa so happy that she resurrected all of Chand's sons and restored his fame and fortunes. The Mangal kavyas say that after this, the worship of Manasa was popular forever.

Manasa Mangalkavya attributes Manasa's difficulty in attracting devotees to an unjust curse she gave to Chand in his previous life. Chand then retaliated with a counter-curse that worshiping her would not be popular on earth unless he worshiped her also.

Ananda K. Coomaraswamy and Sister Nivedita say, "[The] legend of [Chand Sadagar and] Manasā Devī, [...] who must be as old as the Mykenean stratum in Asiatic society, reflects the conflict between the religion of Shiva and that of female local deities in Bengal. Afterwards Manasā or Padmā was recognized as a form of Shakti, [...] and her worship accepted by Shaivas. She is a phase of the mother-divinity who for so many worshipers is nearer and dearer than the far-off and impersonal Shiva...".

Worship

Generally, Manasa is worshiped without an image. A branch of a tree, an earthen pot or an earthen snake image is worshiped as the goddess, though images of Manasa are worshipped too. She is worshiped for protection from and cure of snake bites and infectious diseases like smallpox and chicken pox.

The following of Manasa is most widespread in Bengal, where she is ritually worshiped in temples. The goddess is widely worshiped in the rainy season, when the snakes are most active. Manasa is also a very important fertility deity, especially among the lower castes, and her blessings are invoked during marriage or for childlessness. She is usually worshiped and mentioned along with Neto, who is called Neta, Netidhopani, Netalasundori, etc. in various parts of Bengal.

In North Bengal, among the Rajbanshis, Manasa (called Bishohora, Bishohori or Padmavati) is one of the most important goddesses, and her thaan (shrine) may be found in the courtyard of almost every agrarian household. Among the lower-caste Hindus of East Bengal (present-day Bangladesh)too, she is worshiped with great pomp.

Manasa is an especially important deity in Bengal for the mercantile castes. This is because Chando of the Manasamangal was the first to initiate her worship, and Behula, the heroine of the Manasamangal was a daughter of the Saha clan (a powerful trading community).

Manasa is the prime deity of Anga Region, specially in Anga's capital, Champa (now Bhagalpur). It is believed that the story of Chand Saudagar and Behula started from this very place. In the old quarters of Champanagar in the city, stands an enormous temple of Manasa. Several artefacts and sculptures found in and around the place made locals believed that it was where Chand Saudagar had his Rajbari. A recent excavation has also found "Loha- Bashor ghor" or "Bashor ghor", the building made specifically for the wedding night of Lakhendar and Behula. The Angika lokgatha, "Behula Bishari Lokgatha" and the regional art, Manjusha Chitrakatha is full flegedly based on the chronicles of Manasa and the hardships of Behula. Every year, from 16 to 19 August, Bhagalpur springs up like a scented flower to worship the local guardian Manasa and commemorate the wedding of Behula

Manasa is also worshiped extensively in Assam and Tripura, and a kind of Oja-Pali (musical folk theatre) is dedicated entirely to her myth.

Manasa is ceremonially worshiped on Nag Panchami - a festival of snake worship in the Hindu month of Shravan (July–August). Bengali women observe a fast (vrata) on this day and offer milk at snake holes.

Manasa Devi is worshipped in Andhra Pradesh.

Notable temples

 Shri Manasa Devi Temple (Swayambu), Kasimpet(Manasavaram), Karimnagar, Telangana
 Mansa Bishari Temple, Bhagalpur, Bihar
 Mansa Devi Temple, Mukkamala, West Godavari, Andhra Pradesh
 Mansa Devi Temple, Naidupeta, Nellore, Andhra Pradesh
 Mansa Devi Temple, Tilaru, Srikakulam, Andhra Pradesh
 Mansa Devi Temple, Dornipadu, Kurnool, Andhra Pradesh
 Mansa Devi Temple, Kanumalapalle, Kadapa, Andhra Pradesh
 Mansa Devi Temple, Chinadugam, Srikakulam, Andhra Pradesh
 Mansa Devi Temple, Kurnool, Andhra Pradesh
 Mansa Devi Temple, Nellore, Andhra Pradesh
 Mansa Devi Temple, Thurpu Rompidodla, Nellore, Andhra Pradesh
 Mansa Devi Temple, Vadluru, West Godavari, Andhra Pradesh
 Ma Manasha Mandir, Lake Town, Kolkata, West Bengal

See also

 Shesha
 Vasuki
 Kadru

Notes

References
 
 
 
 
 

Fertility goddesses
Hindu goddesses
Nāgas
Characters in the Mahabharata
Snake goddesses
Hindu folk deities